Mikrokomi is a village and a community of the Volvi municipality. Before the 2011 local government reform it was part of the municipality of Egnatia. The 2011 census recorded 61 inhabitants in the village. Mikrokomi is a part of the community of Profitis.

See also
 List of settlements in the Thessaloniki regional unit

References

Populated places in Thessaloniki (regional unit)